The 1948–49 season was Arsenal's 30th consecutive season in the top division of English football.

Results
Arsenal's score comes first

Legend

FA Charity Shield

Arsenal entered the FA Charity Shield as 1947-48 League champions, in which they faced FA Cup winners Manchester United.

Football League First Division

Final League table

FA Cup

Arsenal entered the FA Cup in the third round, in which they were drawn to face Tottenham Hotspur.

See also

 1948–49 in English football
 List of Arsenal F.C. seasons

References

English football clubs 1948–49 season
1948-49